Grimpoteuthis megaptera is a species of umbrella octopus known from five specimens, collected by Addison Emery Verrill. Between two and three of these specimens may belong to different species.

Description and habitat

G. megaptera lives in the Atlantic Ocean off of Martha's Vineyard in the United States. It was found 4,600 meters deep.

Its full length reaches 107 millimeters. Its eyes are small, as are its suckers and cirri. 

The octopus' arms and web, when viewed orally, are brown. G. megaptera has yellow suckers and a blue-white mantle and fins. The mantle is spotted with irregular brown-purple markings.

References

Octopuses
Molluscs of the Atlantic Ocean
Molluscs described in 1885